Chiling waterfalls, located on the path to Fraser's Hill are several waterfalls located in Selangor, Malaysia. The waterfalls are composed of three separate vertical waterfalls.

Directions 

The Chiling Falls are probably the most beautiful waterfalls of Selangor. They can be reached after an adventurous trek along the river, which has to be crossed many times. To reach the trail head, you take the road from Kuala Kubu Baru to the Gap. After passing the Selangor Dam, you cross the bridge on the Chiling river. Just after this bridge you can park you car. Follow the road for about 100 meters, the trail head is clearly indicated. Soon you will arrive at an open field beside the river, with some buildings and a campsite, maintained by the Fisheries department.

External links
Chiling waterfalls on waterfallsofmalaysia.com

 

Waterfalls of Malaysia
Nature sites of Selangor
Landforms of Selangor